New Zealand is divided into sixteen regions for local government purposes. Eleven are administered by regional councils (the top tier of local government), and five are administered by unitary authorities, which are territorial authorities (the second tier of local government) that also perform the functions of regional councils. The Chatham Islands Council is not a region but is similar to a unitary authority, authorised under its own legislation.

Current regions

History and statutory basis
The regional councils are listed in Part 1 of Schedule 2 of the Local Government Act 2002, along with reference to the Gazette notices that established them in 1989. The Act requires regional councils to promote sustainable developmentthe social, economic, environmental and cultural well-being of their communities.

The current regions and most of their councils came into being through a local government reform in 1989 that took place under the Local Government Act 1974. The regional councils replaced the more than 700 ad hoc bodies that had been formed in the preceding century – roads boards, catchment boards, drainage boards, pest control boards, harbour boards, domain and reserve boards. In addition they took over some roles that had previously been performed by county councils.

The boundaries of the regions are based largely on drainage basins.  This anticipated the responsibilities of the Resource Management Act 1991. Most regional boundaries conform with territorial authority boundaries but there are a number of exceptions. An example is Taupo District, split between four regions, although most of its area is in the Waikato region. There is often a high degree of co-operation between regional and territorial councils as they have complementary roles.

Resource management functions
Regional councils have these specific functions under the Resource Management Act 1991:
Planning for the integrated management of natural and physical resources
Planning for regionally significant land uses
Soil conservation, water quality and quantity, water ecosystems, natural hazards, hazardous substances 
Controlling the coastal marine area
Controlling via resource consents the taking, use, damming or diverting of water 
Controlling via resource consents the discharge  of contaminants
Establishing of rules in a regional plan to allocate water
Controlling via resource consents the beds of waterbodies

Other functions
Regional councils have responsibility for functions under other statutes;

 flood and river control under the Soil Conservation and Rivers Control Act 1941,
 reserves vested in regional councils under the Reserves Act 1977,
 civil defence under the Civil Defence Act 1990,
 regional pest management under the Biosecurity Act 1993,
 harbour and water navigation under the Maritime Transport Act 1994,
 hazardous waste under the HSNO Act 1996, 
 public transport planning under the Land Transport Act 1998, and
 supervision of the safety of dams under the Building Act 2004.

List of regions

Notes:

(1) These regions have unitary authorities.

(2) The Gisborne Region is still widely but unofficially known by its former name East Cape or as the East Coast.

Areas outside regional boundaries 
Some outlying islands are not included within regional boundaries. The Chatham Islands is not in a region, although its council has some of the powers of a regional council under the Resource Management Act 1991. The Kermadecs and the subantarctic islands are inhabited only by a small number of Department of Conservation staff and there is no regional council for these islands.

Governance
Regional councils are popularly elected every three years in accordance with the Local Electoral Act 2001, except for the Canterbury regional council, which is a mixture of elected councilors and government appointed commissioners. Councils may use a first-past-the-post or single transferable vote system. The chairperson is selected by the elected council members.

Finances
Regional councils are funded through property rates, subsidies from central government, income from trading, and user charges for certain public services. Councils set their own levels of rates, though the mechanism for collecting it usually involves channelling through the territorial authority collection system.

Predecessors of current structure

Auckland
The Auckland Regional Council (now the Auckland Council) was preceded by the Auckland Regional Authority (ARA), which existed from 1963 to 1989.

Wellington
The Wellington Regional Council was first formed in 1980 from a merger of the Wellington Regional Planning Authority and the Wellington Regional Water Board.

United councils
In 1978, legislation was passed enabling the formation of regions with united councils. Twenty regions were designated, excluding the Auckland and Wellington areas. For most of the country this was the first regional level of government since the abolition of provinces in 1876.
Councillors were not elected directly – they were appointed from the various territorial local authorities (TLAs) within the region.

The only responsibilities mandated by the legislation were coordination of civil defence and development of a regional plan, although the constituent TLAs could agree on additional responsibilities at the point of formation of each united council. For example, in a number of cases the united council took responsibility for the allocation of revenue from regional petrol taxes.

The united councils were based in the facilities of the largest TLA in the region and largely dependent on the TLAs for resources. They were allowed to levy rates but in most cases had minimal operating budgets (below $100,000 per annum). The notable exception was Canterbury, where the united council had a number of responsibilities. Only one united council undertook any direct operational activity – a forestry project in Wanganui.

Source: Summary of the Functions and Activities of United Councils. Dept of Internal Affairs, 1984.

See also
List of regions of New Zealand by Human Development Index
Local Government New Zealand
Provinces of New Zealand
Territorial authorities of New Zealand

References

External links
 Regional councils of New Zealand at the Department of Internal Affairs

 
Lists of subdivisions of New Zealand
New Zealand 1
Regions, New Zealand